The Scottish church may refer to:

Church of Scotland
Scottish Episcopal Church
Roman Catholic Church in Scotland

See also
 Christianity in Scotland
 British church (disambiguation)